Andrea Ghion (born 23 February 2000) is an Italian professional footballer who plays as a midfielder for  club Catanzaro, on loan from Sassuolo.

Club career
Ghion joined the youth academy of Sassuolo in 2015. He made his senior debut with Sassuolo in a 3–1 Serie A win over Fiorentina on 1 July 2020.

On 5 October 2020, he was loaned to Serie C club Carpi.

On 31 August 2021, he joined Perugia on a 2-years loan. On 25 August 2022, that loan was cut short and Ghion was loaned to Catanzaro instead.

International career
Ghion represented the Italy U16s in a 2–0 friendly win over the Bulgaria U16s on 26 August 2015.

References

External links

2000 births
Living people
Sportspeople from Mantua
Italian footballers
Italy youth international footballers
Association football midfielders
U.S. Sassuolo Calcio players
A.C. Carpi players
A.C. Perugia Calcio players
U.S. Catanzaro 1929 players
Serie A players
Serie B players
Serie C players
Footballers from Lombardy